Ralph Jezzard (born 16 January 1966 in South London) is a British music producer based in London, England.

History
Jezzard started playing in bands at the age of 14 including Case. At 16 he started working at Wickham Studios in South London as a tape operator, and the first record he engineered was a band called Blood and Roses' EP, which reached number 4 in the UK indie charts in 1983. From there he began engineering full-time in the studio working with various punk bands including Angelic Upstarts, Cock Sparrer, The Business, The Damned, Chiefs of Relief and The Sid Presley Experience.

He then moved to the Beat Farm Studios in London Bridge as the Acid House scene was emerging in Britain and worked with Rhythm King acts such as Bomb The Bass and Merlin. The combination of electronica and punk/rock music led to his first production job with EMF's worldwide hit "Unbelievable" which reached No. 1 in the US.

Ralph continued working with rock/alternative bands throughout the 90s including The Wildhearts, Senseless Things, Claytown Troupe, Chapterhouse and more. See full credits below for more details.

A friendship with Wildhearts drummer Ritch Battersby led to the formation of Grand Theft Audio along with Chris McCormack from 3 Colours Red and Jay Butler from Real TV. The band were soon signed to London Sire and toured extensively in the US and Europe. Their only album was called Blame Everyone and had notable success with the songs "Stoopid Ass" and "We Love You" getting inclusion on soundtracks for Dude, Where's My Car?, Hole, Driven, American Pie 2 and many more. The songs were also featured on computer games including Gran Turismo 3.

In 2003 Grand Theft Audio split up. All band members went their own way and Jezzard moved to Texas where he continued production and engineering at Willie Nelson's studio in Austin. In 2005 Jezzard returned to the UK after recording Valor Del Corazon with Ginger from The Wildhearts. During this time he met his wife, music marketing consultant Sammy Andrews who was managing Ginger and the release of Valor Del Corazon.

Shortly after returning to the UK he co-produced Amy Studt's  album My Paper Made Men in Eden Studios for 19 Entertainment and mixed live tracks for Simple Kid

Present
Ralph is currently writing and producing songs with Cass Browne (Gorillaz) and mixing a record for UK band Fearless (Mercury Records UK).

Film and television soundtracks/composing
Driven
The Hole
Tomcats
Dude, Where's My Car
Joe Somebody
Point Break

Game soundtracks/composing
Gran Turismo 3
FIFA 2001
Urban Chaos
Sammy Sosa Baseball
Shaun Palmers Pro Snowboarding
The Hulk

External links
Sammy Andrews Blog on Myspace
Gingers Blog on Wildhearts Website
www.discogs.com
EMF Website

1966 births
Living people
English record producers